Pepe Guilavogui (born 2 June 1993) is a Guinean football midfielder.

Club career

FC ViOn Zlaté Moravce - Vráble
Guilavogui made his professional Fortuna Liga debut for ViOn Zlaté Moravce against Spartak Myjava on 16 July 2016.

International career
Guilavogui represented the Guinea U20s at the 2016 Toulon Tournament.

References

External links
 FC Spartak Trnava official club profile
 Fortuna Liga profile
 
 Eurofotbal profile
 Futbalnet profile
 NFT Profile

1993 births
Living people
Sportspeople from Conakry
Guinean footballers
Guinea international footballers
Guinea youth international footballers
Guinean expatriate footballers
Association football forwards
Rayo Vallecano B players
Atlético Madrid B players
FC Spartak Trnava players
FC ViOn Zlaté Moravce players
Stade Bordelais (football) players
Orihuela CF players
Slovak Super Liga players
2. Liga (Slovakia) players
Segunda División B players
Championnat National 2 players
Expatriate footballers in Spain
Expatriate footballers in France
Expatriate footballers in Slovakia
Guinean expatriate sportspeople in Spain
Guinean expatriate sportspeople in France
Guinean expatriate sportspeople in Slovakia